Te with descender (Ҭ ҭ; italics: Ҭ ҭ) is a letter of the Cyrillic script. Its form is derived from the Cyrillic letter Te (Т т Т т) by the addition of a descender to the leg of the letter.

Computing codes

See also
Ŧ ŧ : Latin letter T with stroke
Ţ ţ : Latin letter T with cedilla
Ț ț : Latin letter T with comma
Ꚋ ꚋ : Cyrillic letter Te with middle hook
Cyrillic characters in Unicode

References

Cyrillic letters with diacritics
Letters with descender (diacritic)